This is a list of the Russian moth species of the superfamily Noctuoidea. It also acts as an index to the species articles and forms part of the full List of moths of Russia.

Notodontidae

Allodonta plebeja (Oberthür, 1881)
Besaia pallida (Butler, 1877)
Cerura erminea (Esper, 1783)
Cerura felina Butler, 1877
Cerura vinula (Linnaeus, 1758)
Clostera albosigma (Fitch, 1856)
Clostera anachoreta (Denis & Schiffermüller), 1775)
Clostera anastomosis (Linnaeus, 1758)
Clostera curtula (Linnaeus, 1758)
Clostera pigra (Hufnagel, 1766)
Cnethodonta grisescens Staudinger, 1887
Dicranura tsvetaevi Schintlmeister & Sviridov, 1985
Dicranura ulmi (Denis & Schiffermüller, 1775)
Drymonia dodonaea ([Denis & Schiffermüller], 1775)
Drymonia dodonides (Staudinger, 1887)
Drymonia japonica (Wileman, 1911)
Drymonia obliterata (Esper, 1785)
Drymonia querna ([Denis & Schiffermüller], 1775)
Drymonia ruficornis (Hufnagel, 1766)
Drymonia velitaris (Hufnagel, 1766)
Eligmodonta ziczac (Linnaeus, 1758)
Ellida albimacula (Staudinger, 1877)
Ellida arcuata Alphéraky, 1897
Ellida branickii (Oberthür, 1881)
Ellida viridimixta (Bremer, 1861)
Epinotodonta fumosa Matsumura, 1920
Epinotodonta leucodera (Staudinger, 1887)
Epodonta lineata (Oberthür, 1881)
Euhampsonia cristata (Butler, 1877)
Euhampsonia splendida (Oberthür, 1880)
Fentonia ocypete (Bremer, 1861)
Furcula aeruginosa (Christoph, 1872)
Furcula bicuspis (Borkhausen, 1790)
Furcula bifida (Brahm, 1787)
Furcula furcula (Clerck, 1759)
Furcula interrupta (Christoph, 1867)
Furcula petri (Alphéraky, 1882)
Gluphisia crenata (Esper, 1785)
Gonoclostera timoniorum (Bremer, 1864)
Hagapteryx admirabiilis (Staudinger, 1887)
Hagapteryx mirabilior (Oberthür, 1911)
Harpyia milhauseri (Fabricius, 1775)
Harpyia tokui (Sugi, 1977)
Harpyia umbrosa (Staudinger, 1892)
Hemifentonia mandschurica (Oberthür, 1911)
Himeropteryx miraculosa Staudinger, 1887
Hupodonta corticalis Butler, 1877
Hupodonta lignea Matsumura, 1919
Leucodonta bicoloria ([Denis & Schiffermüller], 1775)
Lophocosma atriplaga Staudinger, 1887
Lophontosia cuculus (Staudinger, 1887)
Micromelalopha flavomaculata Tschistjakov, 1977
Micromelalopha sieversi (Staudinger, 1892)
Micromelalopha troglodyta (Graeser, 1890)
Microphalera grisea Butler, 1885
Nerice bipartita Butler, 1885
Nerice davidi (Oberthür, 1881)
Nerice leechi (Staudinger, 1892)
Notodonta dembowskii Oberthür, 1879
Notodonta dromedarius (Linnaeus, 1758)
Notodonta jankowskii (Oberthür, 1879)
Notodonta stigmatica Matsumura, 1920
Notodonta torva (Hübner, [1803])
Notodonta tritophus ([Denis & Schiffermüller], 1775)
Odontosia brinikhi Dubatolov, 2006
Odontosia carmelita (Esper, 1799)
Odontosia patricia Stichel, 1918
Odontosia sieversii (Menetries, 1856)
Peridea aliena (Staudinger, 1892)
Peridea anceps (Goeze, 1781)
Peridea elzet Kiriakoff, 1963
Peridea gigantea Butler, 1877
Peridea graeseri (Staudinger, 1892)
Peridea lativitta (Wileman, 1911)
Peridea moltrechti (Oberthür, 1911)
Peridea oberthueri (Staudinger, 1892)
Phalera assimilis (Bremer & Grey, 1853)
Phalera bucephala (Linnaeus, 1758)
Phalera bucephaloides (Ochsenheimer, 1810)
Phalera flavescens (Bremer & Grey, 1852)
Phalera takasagoensis Matsumura, 1919
Phalerodonta bombycina (Oberthür, 1881)
Pheosia fusiformis Matsumura, 1921
Pheosia gnoma (Fabricius, 1776)
Pheosia grummi (Christoph, 1885)
Pheosia rimosa Packard, 1864
Pheosia tremula (Clerck, 1759)
Pheosiopsis cinerea (Butler, 1879)
Pterostoma grisea (Bremer, 1861)
Pterostoma palpina (Clerck, 1759)
Pterostoma sinicum Moore, 1877
Pterotes eugenia (Staudinger, 1896)
Ptilodon capucina (Linnaeus, 1758)
Ptilodon cucullina ([Denis & Schiffermüller], 1775)
Ptilodon hoegei (Graeser, 1888)
Ptilodon jezoensis Matsumura, 1919
Ptilodon ladislai (Oberthür, 1879)
Ptilodon robusta (Matsumura, 1924)
Ptilodon saerdabensis (Daniel, 1938)
Ptilophora jezoensis (Matsumura, 1920)
Ptilophora nohirae (Matsumura, 1920)
Ptilophora plumigera ([Denis & Schiffermüller], 1775)
Pygaera timon (Hübner, 1803)
Rosama ornata (Oberthür, 1884)
Semidonta biloba (Oberthür, 1880)
Shaka atrovittata (Bremer, 1861)
Spatalia argentina ([Denis & Schiffermüller], 1775)
Spatalia dives Oberthür, 1884
Spatalia doerriesi Graeser, 1888
Spatalia plusiotis (Oberthür, 1880)
Stauropus basalis Moore, 1877
Stauropus fagi (Linnaeus, 1758)
Takadonta takamukui Matsumura, 1920
Thaumetopoea pinivora (Treitschke, 1834)
Togepteryx velutina (Oberthür, 1880)
Torigea straminea (Moore, 1877)
Uropyia meticulodina (Oberthür, 1884)
Wilemanus bidentatus (Wileman, 1911) -- Обсидианова пеперуда

Lymantriidae

Arctornis alba (Bremer, 1861)
Arctornis l-nigrum (Miller, 1764)
Calliteara abietis ([Denis & Schiffermüller], 1775)
Calliteara conjuncta (Wileman, 1911)
Calliteara lunulata (Butler, 1887)
Calliteara pseudabietis Butler, 1885
Calliteara pudibunda (Linnaeus, 1758)
Calliteara virginea (Oberthür, 1870)
Cifuna locuples Walker, 1855
Dicallomera angelus (Tschetverikov, 1904)
Dicallomera fascelina (Linnaeus, 1758)
Dicallomera kusnetzovi Lukhtanov & Khruleva, 1989
Dicallomera olga (Oberthür, 1881)
Dicallomera pumila (Staudinger, 1881)
Euproctis chrysorrhoea (Linnaeus, 1758)
Euproctis karghalica (Moore, 1878)
Euproctis niphonis (Butler, 1881)
Euproctis piperita Oberthür, 1880
Euproctis similis (Fuessly, 1775)
Euproctis subflava (Bremer, 1864)
Gynaephora relictus (Bang-Haas, 1927)
Gynaephora selenitica (Esper, 1783)
Ivela ochropoda (Eversmann, 1847)
Laelia coenosa (Hübner, [1808])
Leucoma candida (Staudinger, 1892)
Leucoma salicis (Linnaeus, 1758)
Lymantria dispar (Linnaeus, 1758)
Lymantria grisescens (Staudinger, 1887)
Lymantria mathura Walker, 1865
Lymantria monacha (Linnaeus, 1758)
Neocifuna eurydice (Butler, 1885)
Neocifuna jankowskii (Oberthür, 1884)
Numenes disparilis Staudinger, 1887
Orgyia antiqua (Linnaeus, 1758)
Parocneria detrita (Esper, 1785)
Parocneria furva (Leech, 1889)
Parocneria signatoria (Christoph, 1883)
Penthophera morio (Linnaeus, 1767)
Teia antiquiodes (Hübner, [1822])
Teia dubia (Tauscher, 1806)
Teia ochrolimbata (Staudinger, 1881)
Teia recens (Hübner, [1819])

Noctuidae
Abromias altijuga (W. Kozhantschikov, 1925)
Abromias brunnescens Kononenko, 1985
Abromias commixta (Butler, 1881)
Abromias ferrago (Eversmann, 1837)
Abromias furva ([Denis & Schiffermüller], 1775)
Abromias groenlandica (Duponchel, [1838])
Abromias hampsoni Sugi, 1963
Abromias lateritia (Hufnagel, 1766)
Abromias lithoxylaea ([Denis & Schiffermüller], 1775)
Abromias maillardi (Geyer, [1834])
Abromias monoglypha (Hufnagel, 1766)
Abromias oblonga (Haworth, 1809)
Abromias platinea (Treitschke, 1825)
Abromias pseudoaltijuga Grosser, 1985
Abromias rubrirena (Treitschke, 1825)
Abromias sublustris (Esper, 1788)
Abromias veterina (Lederer, 1853)
Abrostola asclepiadis ([Denis & Schiffermüller], 1775)
Abrostola clarissa (Staudinger, 1900)
Abrostola hyrcanica Hacker, 2002
Abrostola kaszabi Dufay, 1971
Abrostola korbi Dufay, 1958
Abrostola pacifica Dufay, 1960
Abrostola tripartita (Hufnagel, 1766)
Abrostola triplasia (Linnaeus, 1758)
Abrostola ussuriensis Dufay, 1958
Acantholipes regularis (Hübner, [1813])
Acontia lucida (Hufnagel, 1766)
Acontia melanura (Tauscher, 1809)
Acontia olivacea (Hampson, 1891)
Acontia panaceorum (Menetries, 1849)
Acontia titania (Esper, 1798)
Acontia trabealis (Scopoli, 1763)
Acosmetia biguttula (Motschulsky, 1866)
Acosmetia caliginosa (Hübner, [1813])
Acosmetia chinensis (Wallengren, 1860)
Acronicta aceris (Linnaeus, 1758)
Acronicta adaucta Warren, 1909
Acronicta alni (Linnaeus, 1767)
Acronicta auricoma ([Denis & Schiffermüller], 1775)
Acronicta bellula Alphéraky, 1895
Acronicta carbonaria Graeser, [1890]
Acronicta catocaloida Graeser, [1889]
Acronicta cinerea (Hufnagel, 1766)
Acronicta concerpta Draudt, 1937
Acronicta cuspis (Hübner, [1813])
Acronicta digna (Butler, 1881)
Acronicta hercules R.Felder & Rogenhofer, 1874
Acronicta intermedia Warren, 1909
Acronicta jozana Matsumura, 1926
Acronicta leporina (Linnaeus, 1758)
Acronicta leucocuspis Butler, 1878
Acronicta lutea Bremer & Grey, 1852
Acronicta major Bremer, 1861
Acronicta megacephala ([Denis & Schiffermüller], 1775)
Acronicta menyanthidis (Esper, 1789)
Acronicta omorii Matsumura, 1926
Acronicta psi (Linnaeus, 1758)
Acronicta raphael Oberthür, 1884
Acronicta rumicis (Linnaeus, 1758)
Acronicta strigosa ([Denis & Schiffermüller], 1775)
Acronicta sugii (Kinoshita, 1990)
Acronicta tridens ([Denis & Schiffermüller], 1775)
Acronicta vulpina (Grote, 1883)
Actebia ala (Staudinger, 1881)
Actebia difficilis (Erschoff, 1887)
Actebia fennica (Tauscher, 1837)
Actebia fugax (Treitschke, 1825)
Actebia multifida (Lederer, 1870)
Actebia opisoleuca (Staudinger, 1881)
Actebia praecox (Linnaeus, 1758)
Actebia praecurrens (Staudinger, 1888)
Actebia squalida (Guenée, 1852)
Actebia taurica (Staudinger, 1879)
Actinotia intermediata (Bremer, 1861)
Actinotia polyodon (Clerck, 1759)
Actinotia radiosa (Esper, 1804)
Aedia funesta (Esper, 1786)
Aedia leucomelas (Linnaeus, 1758)
Aedophron phlebophora Lederer, 1858
Aedophron rhodites (Eversraan, 1851)
Aegle kaekeritziana (Hübner, [1799])
Aegle semicana (Esper, 1798)
Agrochola circellaris (Hufnagel, 1766)
Agrochola egorovi (Bang-Haas, 1934)
Agrochola helvola (Linnaeus, 1758)
Agrochola humilis ([Denis & Schiffermüller], 1775)
Agrochola laevis (Hübner, [1803])
Agrochola litura (Linnaeus, 1758)
Agrochola lota (Clerck, 1759)
Agrochola lychnitis ([Denis & Schiffermüller], 1775)
Agrochola macilenta (Hübner, [1809])
Agrochola nitida ([Denis & Schiffermüller], 1775)
Agrochola vulpecula (Lederer, 1853)
Agrotis bigramma (Esper, [1790])
Agrotis characteristica Alphéraky, 1892
Agrotis cinerea ([Denis & Schiffermüller], 1775)
Agrotis clavis (Hufnagel, 1766)
Agrotis desertorum Boisduval, 1840
Agrotis exclamationis (Linnaeus, 1758)
Agrotis fatidica (Hübner, [1824])
Agrotis frater Fibiger, Ahola & Nupponen, 2006
Agrotis humigena Pungeler, [1899]
Agrotis incognita Staudinger, 1988
Agrotis ipsilon (Hufnagel, 1766)
Agrotis iremeli Nupponen, Ahola & Kullberg, 2001
Agrotis militaris Staudinger, 188810380
Agrotis murinoides Poole, 1989
Agrotis obesa (Boisduval, 1829)
Agrotis psammoda Staudinger, 1895
Agrotis puta (Hübner, [1803])
Agrotis ripae (Hübner, [1823])
Agrotis ruta (Eversmann, 1851)
Agrotis scotacra (Filipjev, 1927)
Agrotis segetum ([Denis & Schiffermüller], 1775)
Agrotis spinifera (Hübner, [1808])
Agrotis submolesta Pungeler, [1899]
Agrotis tokionis Butler, 1881
Agrotis trifurca Eversmann, 1837
Agrotis trux (Hübner, [1824])
Agrotis vestigialis (Hufnagel, 1766)
Agrotis villosus Alphéraky, 1887
Aiteta curvilinea (Staudinger, 1892)
Allophyes benedictina (Staudinger, 1892)
Allophyes oxyacanthae (Linnaeus, 1758)
Ammoconia caecimacula ([Denis & Schiffermüller], 1775)
Ammoconia senex (Geyer, 1828)
Ammogrotis suavis Staudinger, 1895
Amphipoea asiatica (Burrows, 1911)
Amphipoea aslanbeki L Ronkay & Herczig, 1991
Amphipoea bifurcata Gyulai & L. Ronkay, 1994
Amphipoea burrowsi (Chapman, 1912)
Amphipoea crinanensis (Burrows, 1908)
Amphipoea fucosa (Freyer, 1830)
Amphipoea lucens (Freyer, 1845)
Amphipoea ochreola (Staudinger, 1882)
Amphipoea oculea (Linnaeus, 1761)
Amphipoea ussuriensis (Petersen, 1914)
Amphipyra berbera Rungs, 1949
Amphipyra erebina Butler, 1878
Amphipyra jankowskii Oberthür, 1884
Amphipyra livida ([Denis & Schiffermüller], 1775)
Amphipyra molybdea Christoph, 1867
Amphipyra perflua (Fabricius, 1787)
Amphipyra pyramidea (Linnaeus, 1758)
Amphipyra schrenkii Menetries, 1859
Amphipyra sergei (Staudinger, 1888)
Amphipyra tetra (Fabricius, 1787)
Amphipyra tragopoginis (Clerck, 1759)
Amyna axis Guenée, 1852
Amyna punctum (Fabricius, 1794)
Anacronicta caliginea (Butler, 1881)
Anacronicta nitida (Butler, 1878)
Anadevidia hebetata (Butler, 1889)
Anadevidia peponis (Fabricius, 1775)
Anapamea incerta (Staudinger, 1892)
Anaplectoides prasina ([Denis & Schiffermüller], 1775)
Anaplectoides virens (Butler, 1878)
Anarta colletti (Sparre-Schneider, 1876)
Anarta dianthi (Tauscher, 1809)
Anarta farnhami (Grote, 1873)
Anarta furca (Eversmann, 1852)
Anarta hoplites (Staudinger, 1901)
Anarta imperspicua Hacker, 1998
Anarta latemarginata (Wiltshire, 1976)
Anarta melanopa (Thunberg, 1791)
Anarta mendax (Staudinger, 1879)
Anarta militzae (I.Kozhantshikov, 1948)
Anarta myrtilli (Linnaeus, 1761)
Anarta nupponenorum Hacker & Fibiger, 2002
Anarta odontites (Boisduval, 1829)
Anarta schawyra (Bang-Haas, 1927)
Anarta stigmosa (Christoph, 1887)
Anarta trifolii (Hufnagel, 1766)
Anatatha lignea (Butler, 1879)
Anomis flava (Fabricius, 1775)
Anomis involuta (Walker, [1858])
Anomis leucolopha Prout, 1928
Anomis mesogona (Walker, 1858)
Anomis privata (Walker, 1865)
Anorthoa angustipennis (Matsumura, 1926)
Anorthoa munda ([Denis & Schiffermüller], 1775)
Antarchaea conicephala (Staudinger, 1870)
Anterastria atrata (Butler, 1881)
Antha grata (Butler, 1881)
Anthracia eriopoda (Herrich-Schäffer, 1851)
Antitype chi (Linnaeus, 1758)
Antivaleria viridimacula (Graeser, [1889])
Antoculeora locuples (Oberthür, 1881)
Anumeta atrosignata Walker, 1858
Anumeta cestis (Menetries, 1849)
Anumeta fractistrigata (Alphéraky, 1882)
Anumeta henkei Staudinger, 1877
Anumeta spilota Erschoff, 1874
Apamea anceps ([Denis & Schiffermüller], 1775)
Apamea aquila Donzel, 1837
Apamea crenata (Hufnagel, 1766)
Apamea epomidion (Haworth, 1809)
Apamea exstincta (Staudinger, 1889)
Apamea illyria Freyer, 1846
Apamea leucodon (Eversmann, 1837)
Apamea remissa (Hübner, [1809])
Apamea scolopacina (Esper, 1788)
Apamea sordens (Hufnagel, 1766)
Apamea striata Haruta & Sugi, 1958
Apamea unanimis (Hübner, [1813])
Apaustis rupicola ([Denis & Schiffermüller], 1775)
Apopestes indica Moore, 1883
Apopestes noe L. Ronkay, 1990
Aporophyla canescens (Duponchel, 1826)
Aporophyla lutulenta ([Denis &. Schiffermüller], 1775)
Aporophyla nigra (Haworth, 1809)
Apterogenum ypsillon ([Denis & Schiffermüller], 1775)
Araeopteron amoena Inoue, 1958
Araeopteron fragmenta Inoue, 1965
Archanara dissoluta (Treitschke, 1825)
Archanara neurica (Hübner, [1808])
Archanara phragmiticola (Staudinger, 1892)
Archanara resoluta (Hampson, 1910)
Arcte coerula (Guenée, 1852)
Arenostola phragmitidis (Hübner, [1803])
Argyrospila succinea (Esper, 1798)
Ariolica argentea (Butler, 1881)
Armada barrygoateri Fibiger, L. Ronkay & G. Ronkay, 2003
Artena dotata (Fabricius, 1794)
Arytrura musculus (Menetries, 1859)
Arytrura subfalcata (Menetries, 1859)
Asteropetes noctuina (Butler, 1878)
Asteroscopus sphinx (Hufnagel, 1766)
Asteroscopus syriaca (Warren, 1910)
Atethmia ambusta ([Denis & Schiffermüller], 1775)
Atethmia centrago (Haworth, 1809)
Athaumasta expressa (Lederer, 1855)
Athaumasta koreana L. Ronkay & Kononenko, 1998
Athaumasta nana (Staudinger, 1896)
Athaumasta siderigera (Christoph, 1893)
Athaumasta splendida Bang-Haas, 1927
Athetis albisignata (Oberthür, 1879)
Athetis correpta (Pungeler, 1906)
Athetis funesta (Staudinger, 1888)
Athetis furvula (Hübner, [1808])
Athetis gluteosa (Treitschke, 1835)
Athetis hospes (Freyer, 1831)
Athetis lapidea Wileman, 1911
Athetis lepigone (Moschler, 1860)
Athetis lineosa (Moore, 1881)
Athetis pallidipennis Sugi, 1982
Athetis pallustris (Hübner, [1808])
Atrachea alpherakyi Kononenko, 1986
Atrachea jankowskii (Oberthür, 1879)
Atrachea japonica (Leech, 1889)
Atrachea nitens (Butler, 1878)
Atrachea parvispina (Tschetverikov, 1904)
Atuntsea kogii (Sugi, 1977)
Atypha pulmonaris (Esper, 1790)
Auchmis curva (Staudinger, 1889)
Auchmis detersa (Esper, 1787)
Auchmis mongolica (Staudinger, 1896)
Auchmis peterseni (Christoph, 1887)
Auchmis saga (Butler, 1878)
Autographa aemula ([Denis & Schiffermüller], 1775)
Autographa amurica (Staudinger, 1892)
Autographa bractea ([Denis & Schiffermüller], 1775)
Autographa buraetica (Staudinger, 1892)
Autographa camptosema (Hampson, 1913)
Autographa excelsa (Kretschmar, 1862)
Autographa gamma (Linnaeus, 1758)
Autographa jota (Linnaeus, 1758)
Autographa lehri Kljutschko, 1984
Autographa macrogamma (Eversmann, 1842)
Autographa mandarina (Freyer, 1845)
Autographa nekrasovi Kljutschko, 1985
Autographa nigrisigna (Walker, 1858)
Autographa pulchrina (Haworth, 1809)
Autographa ternei Kljutschko, 1984
Autographa urupina (Bryk, 1942)
Autographa v-minus (Oberthür, 1884)
Autophila asiatica (Staudinger, 1888)
Autophila chamaephanes Boursin, 1940
Autophila glebicolor (Erschoff, 1874)
Autophila hirsuta (Staudinger, 1870)
Autophila inconspicua (Butler, 1881)
Autophila libanotica (Staudinger, 1901)
Autophila ligaminosa (Eversmann, 1851)
Autophila limbata (Staudinger, 1871)
Autophila luxuriosa Zerny, 1933
Aventiola pusilla (Butler, 1879)
Axylia putris (Linnaeus, 1761)
Balsa leodura (Staudinger, 1887)
Bastilla arctotaenia (Guenée, 1852)
Bastilla maturata (Walker, 1858)
Behounekia freyeri (Frivaldszky, 1835)
Belciades niveola (Motschulsky, 1866)
Belciana siitanae (Remm, 1983)
Bena bicolorana (Fuessly, 1775)
Bertula bistrigata (Staudinger, 1888)
Blasticorhinus ussuriensis (Bremer, 1861)
Blepharita amica (Treitschke, 1825)
Brachionycha nubeculosa (Esper, 1785)
Brachionycha sajana Draudt, 1934
Brachylomia uralensis (Warren, 1910)
Brachylomia viminalis (Fabricius, 1777)
Brachyxanthia zelotypa (Lederer, 1853)
Bryoleuca albimixta (Sugi, 1980)
Bryoleuca granitalis (Butler, 1881)
Bryoleuca orthogramma Boursin, 1954
Bryomoia melachlora (Staudinger, 1892)
Bryophilina mollicula (Graeser, [1889])
Calamia staudingeri Wamecke, 1941
Calamia tridens (Hufnagel, 1766)
Calliergis ramosula (Staudinger, 1888)
Callistege fortalitium (Tauscher, 1809)
Callistege mi (Clerck, 1759)
Callopistria albolineola (Graeser, [1889])
Callopistria argyrosticta (Butler, 1881)
Callopistria juventina (Stoll, 1782)
Callopistria latreillei (Duponchel, 1827)
Callopistria repleta Walker, 1858
Calophasia lunula (Hufnage1, 1766)
Calophasia opalina (Esper, 1793)
Calymma communimacula ([Denis & Schiffermüller], 1775)
Calyptra hokkaida (Wileman, 1922)
Calyptra lata (Butler, 1881)
Calyptra thalictri (Borkhausen, 1790)
Camptoloma interiorata (Walker, [1865])
Capsula aerata (Butler, 1878)
Capsula algae (Esper, 1789)
Capsula sparganii (Esper, 1790)
Caradrina albina Eversmann, 1848
Caradrina aspersa Rambur, 1834
Caradrina clara Schawerda, 1928
Caradrina clavipalpis (Scopoli, 1763)
Caradrina expansa Alphéraky, 1887
Caradrina fergana Staudinger, [1892]
Caradrina flava Oberthür, 1876
Caradrina fulvafusca Hacker, 2004
Caradrina hypostigma (Boursin, 1932)
Caradrina inumbrata (Staudinger, 1900)
Caradrina kadenii Freyer, 1836
Caradrina montana Bremer, 1861
Caradrina morosa Lederer, 1853
Caradrina morpheus (Hufnagel, 1766)
Caradrina muricolor (Boursin, 1933)
Caradrina pertinax Staudinger, 1879
Caradrina petraea Tengstrom, 1869
Caradrina selimpides (Bellier, 1863)
Caradrina selini Boisduval, 1840
Caradrina sogdiana (Boursin, 1936)
Caradrina terrea Freyer, 1840
Caradrina vicina Staudinger, 1870
Caradrina wullschlegeli Pungeler, 1903
Caradrina zernyi (Boursin, 1939)
Cardepia helix (Boursin, 1962)
Cardepia irrisoria (Erschoff, 1874)
Catephia alchymista ([Denis & Schiffermüller], 1775)
Catocala abamita Bremer & Grey, 1853
Catocala actaea R.Felder & Rogenhofer, 1874
Catocala adultera Menetries, 1856
Catocala agitatrix Graeser, [1889]
Catocala bella Butler, 1877
Catocala bokhaica (Kononenko, 1979)
Catocala columbina Leech, 1900
Catocala conversa (Esper, 1783)
Catocala danilovi (Bang-Haas, 1927)
Catocala deducta Eversmann, 1843
Catocala detrita Warren, 1913
Catocala deuteronympha Staudinger, 1861
Catocala dilecta (Hübner, [1808])
Catocala dissimilis Bremer, 1861
Catocala doerriesi Staudinger, 1888
Catocala dula Bremer, 1861
Catocala electa (Vieweg, 1790)
Catocala ella Butler, 1877
Catocala elocata (Esper, 1787)
Catocala eminens Staudinger, 1892
Catocala fraxini (Linnaeus, 1758)
Catocala fulminea (Scopoli, 1763)
Catocala helena Eversmann, 1856
Catocala hymenaea ([Denis & Schiffermüller], 1775)
Catocala koreana Staudinger, 1892
Catocala kotschubeji Sheljuzhko, 1925
Catocala lara Bremer, 1861
Catocala lupina Herrich-Schäffer, 1851
Catocala moltrechti (Bang-Haas, 1927)
Catocala musmi (Hampson, 1913)
Catocala nagioides Wileman, 1924
Catocala neonympha (Esper, 1805)
Catocala nivea Butler, 1877
Catocala nubila Butler, 1881
Catocala nupta (Linnaeus, 1767)
Catocala nymphaeoides Herrich-Schäffer, 1845
Catocala obscena Alphéraky, 1879
Catocala orientalis Staudinger, 1877
Catocala pacta (Linnaeus, 1758)
Catocala pirata (Herz, 1904)
Catocala praegnax Walker, 1858
Catocala promissa ([Denis & Schiffermüller], 1775)
Catocala proxeneta Alphéraky, 1895
Catocala puerpera (Giorna, 1791)
Catocala separans Leech, 1889
Catocala sponsa (Linnaeus, 1767)
Catocala streckeri Staudinger, 1888
Celaena haworthii (Curtis, 1829)
Ceramica pisi (Linnaeus, 1758)
Cerapteryx graminis (Linnaeus, 1758)
Cerapteryx megala Alphéraky, 1882
Cerastis leucographa ([Denis & Schiffermüller], 1775)
Cerastis orientalis Boursin, 1948
Cerastis pallescens (Butler, 1878)
Cerastis rubricosa ([Denis & Schiffermüller], 1775)
Cervyna cervago (Eversmann, 1844)
Chandata bella (Butler, 1881)
Charanyca trigrammica (Hufnagel, 1766)
Chasminodes aino Sugi, 1956
Chasminodes albonitens (Bremer, 1861)
Chasminodes atrata (Butler, 1884)
Chasminodes bremeri Sugi & Kononenko, 1981
Chasminodes cilia (Staudinger, 1888)
Chasminodes nervosa (Butler, 1881)
Chasminodes pseudalbonitens Sugi, 1955
Chasminodes sugii Kononenko, 1981
Chasminodes ussurica Kononenko, 1982
Chersotis alpestris (Boisduval, 1837)
Chersotis anatolica (Draudt, 1936)
Chersotis andereggii (Boisduval, 1832)
Chersotis capnistis (Lederer, 1872)
Chersotis cuprea ([Denis & Schiffermüller], 1775)
Chersotis deplanata (Eversmann, 1843)
Chersotis elegans (Eversmann, 1837)
Chersotis fimbriola (Esper, 1803)
Chersotis juncta (Grote, 1878)
Chersotis laeta (Rebel, 1904)
Chersotis larixia (Guenée, 1852)
Chersotis margaritacea (De Villers, 1789)
Chersotis multangula (Hübner, [1803])
Chersotis rectangula ([Denis & Schiffermüller], 1775)
Chersotis semna (Pungeler, 1906)
Chersotis stridula (Hampson, 1903)
Chersotis transiens (Staudinger, 1897)
Chilodes distracta (Eversmann, 1848)
Chilodes maritima (Tauscher, 1806)
Chilodes repeteki L. Ronkay, Varga & Hreblay, 1998
Chloantha hyperici ([Denis & Schiffermüller], 1775)
Chrysodeixis chalcites (Esper, 1789)
Chrysorithrum amata (Bremer & Grey, 1853)
Chrysorithrum flavomaculata (Bremer, 1861)
Chytonix albonotata (Staudinger, 1892)
Chytonix subalbonotata Sugi, 1959
Cirrhia fasciata Kononenko, 1978
Cirrhia fulvago (Clerck, 1759)
Cirrhia gilvago ([Denis & Schiffermüller], 1775)
Cirrhia icteritia (Hufnagel, 1766)
Cirrhia ocellaris (Borkhausen, 1792)
Cirrhia tunicata (Graeser, [1890])
Clavipalpula aurariae (Oberthür, 1880)
Cleoceris scoriacea (Esper, 1789)
Cleonymia baetica (Rambur, 1837)
Clytie delunaris (Staudinger, 1889)
Clytie distincta (Bang-Haas, 1907)
Clytie gracilis (Bang-Haas, 1907)
Clytie terrulenta (Christoph, 1893)
Coenagria nana (Staudinger, 1892)
Coenobia orientalis Sugi, 1982
Coenobia rufa (Haworth, 1809)
Coenophila subrosea (Stephens, 1829)
Colobochyla salicalis ([Denis & Schiffermüller], 1775)
Colocasia coryli (Linnaeus, 1758)
Colocasia mus (Oberthilr, 1884)
Condica illecta (Walker, 1865)
Condica illustrata (Staudinger, 1888)
Conisania arida (Lederer, 1855)
Conisania arterialis (Draudt, 1936)
Conisania capsivora (Draudt, 1933)
Conisania cervina (Eversmann, 1842)
Conisania leineri (Freyer, 1836)
Conisania literata (Fischer von Waldheim, 1840)
Conisania luteago ([Denis & Schiffermüller], 1775)
Conisania poelli Stertz, 1915
Conisania suaveola (Draudt, 1950)
Conisania suavis (Staudinger, 1892)
Conistra albipuncta (Leech, 1889)
Conistra ardescens (Butler, 1879)
Conistra castaneofasciata (Motschulsky, [1861])
Conistra erythrocephala ([Denis & Schiffermiller], 1775)
Conistra filipjevi Kononenko, 1978
Conistra fletcheri Sugi, 1958
Conistra grisescens Draudt, 1950
Conistra ligula (Esper, 1791)
Conistra rubiginea ([Denis & Schiffermüller], 1775)
Conistra rubiginosa (Scopoli, 1763)
Conistra vaccinii (Linnaeus, 1761)
Conistra veronicae (Hübner, [1813])
Coranarta carbonaria (Christoph, 1893)
Coranarta cordigera (Thunberg, 1788)
Corgatha costimacula (Staudinger, 1892)
Corgatha obsoleta Marumo, 1932
Cornutifera simplex (Staudinger, 1889)
Cornutiplusia circumflexa (Linnaeus, 1767)
Cosmia affinis (Linnaeus, 1767)
Cosmia camptostigma (Menetries, 1859)
Cosmia cara (Butler, 1881)
Cosmia diffinis (Linnaeus, 1767)
Cosmia inconspicua (Draudt, 1950)
Cosmia moderata (Staudinger, 1888)
Cosmia pyralina ([Denis & Schiffermüller], 1775)
Cosmia restituta Walker, 1857
Cosmia trapezina (Linnaeus, 1758)
Cosmia trapezinula (Filipjev, 1927)
Cosmia unicolor (Staudinger, 1892)
Cranionycta albonigra (Herz, 1904)
Cranionycta jankowskii (Oberthiir, 1880)
Cranionycta oda de Lattin, 1949
Craniophora ligustri ([Denis & Schiffermüller], 1775)
Craniophora pacifica Filipjev, 1927
Craniophora pontica (Staudinger, 1879)
Craniophora praeclara (Graeser, 1890)
Cryphia algae (Fabricius, 1775)
Cryphia amasina (Draudt, 1931)
Cryphia bryophasma (Boursin, 1951)
Cryphia domestica (Hufnagel, 1766)
Cryphia duskei (Christoph, 1893)
Cryphia fraudatricula (Hübner, [1803])
Cryphia griseola (Nagano, 1918)
Cryphia mediofusca (Sugi, 1959)
Cryphia muralis (Forster, 1771)
Cryphia ochsi Boursin, 1941
Cryphia petricolor (Lederer, 1870)
Cryphia protecta (Draudt, 1931)
Cryphia raptricula ([Denis & Schiffermüller], 1775)
Cryphia receptricula (Hübner, [1803])
Cryphia rectilinea (Warren, 1909)
Cryphia seladona (Christoph, 1885)
Cryphia sugitanii Boursin, 1961
Cryphia uzahovi L. Ronkay & Herczig, 1991
Crypsedra gemmea (Treitschke, 1825)
Cryptocala chardinyi (Boisduval, 1829)
Ctenoceratoda brassicina (Draudt, 1934)
Ctenoceratoda peregovitsi Varga & Gyulai, 1999
Ctenoplusia agnata (Staudinger, 1892)
Ctenoplusia albostriata (Bremer & Grey, 1853)
Ctenostola sparganoiaes (O.Bang-Haas, 1927)
Cucullia absinthii (Linnaeus, 1761)
Cucullia amota Alphéraky, 1887
Cucullia argentea (Hufnagel, 1766)
Cucullia argentina (Fabricius, 1787)
Cucullia artemisiae (Hufnagel, 1766)
Cucullia asteris ([Denis & Schiffermüller], 1775)
Cucullia balsamitae Boisduval, 1840
Cucullia behouneki Hacker & L. Ronkay, 1988
Cucullia biornata Fischer von Waldheim, 1840
Cucullia biradiata W. Kozhantschikov, 1925
Cucullia blattariae (Esper, 1790)
Cucullia boryphora (Fischer von Waldheim, 1840)
Cucullia campanulae Freyer, 1831
Cucullia chamomillae ([Denis & Schiffermüller], 1775)
Cucullia cineracea Freyer, 1841
Cucullia dimorpha Staudinger, 1897
Cucullia distinguenda Staudinger, 1892
Cucullia dracunculi (Hübner,[1813])
Cucullia duplicata Staudinger, 1882
Cucullia elongata Butler, 1880
Cucullia erythrocephala (Wagner, 1914)
Cucullia formosa Rogenhofer, 1860
Cucullia fraterna Butler, 1878
Cucullia fraudatrix Eversmann, 1837
Cucullia fuchsiana Eversmann, 1842
Cucullia gnaphalii (Hübner, [1813])
Cucullia gozmanyi G. Ronkay & L. Ronkay, 1994
Cucullia hostilis Boursin, 1934
Cucullia humilis Boursin, 1941
Cucullia inderiensis Herrich-Schäffer, 1856
Cucullia jankowskii Oberthür, 1884
Cucullia kurilullia Bryk, 1942
Cucullia lactea (Fabricius, 1787)
Cucullia lactucae ([Denis & Schiffermüller], 1775)
Cucullia ledereri Staudinger, 1892
Cucullia lindei Heyne, 1899
Cucullia lucifuga ([Denis & Schiffermüller], 1775)
Cucullia lychnitis (Rambur, 1833)
Cucullia maculosa Staudinger, 1888
Cucullia magnifica Freyer, 1839
Cucullia mandschuriae Oberthür, 1884
Cucullia mixta Freyer, 1841
Cucullia naruenensis Staudinger, 1879
Cucullia papoka G. Ronkay & L. Ronkay, 1986
Cucullia perforata Bremer, 1861
Cucullia praecana Eversmann, 1843
Cucullia prenanthis (Boisduva1, 1840)
Cucullia propinqua Eversmann, 1842
Cucullia sabulosa Staudinger, 1879
Cucullia santonici (Hübner, [1813])
Cucullia scopariae Dorfmeister, 1853
Cucullia scoparioides Boursin, 1941
Cucullia scrophulariae ([Denis & Schiffermüller], 1775)
Cucullia spectabilisoides Poole, 1989
Cucullia splendida (Cramer, 1777)
Cucullia strigicosta Boursin, 1940
Cucullia tanaceti ([Denis & Schiffermüller], 1775)
Cucullia thapsiphaga (Treitschke, 1826)
Cucullia tiefi Tshetverikov, 1956
Cucullia tristis Boursin, 1934
Cucullia umbratica (Linnaeus, 1758)
Cucullia verbasci (Linnaeus, 1758)
Cucullia virgaureae Boisduva1, 1840
Cucullia xeranthemi Boisduva1, 1840
Cymatophoropsis trimaculata (Bremer, 1861)
Cymatophoropsis unca (Houlbert, 1921)
Cyrebia anachoreta (Herrich-Schäffer, 1851)
Cyrebia luperinoides (Guenée, 1852)
Daddala lucilla (Butler, 1881)
Dasypolia fani Staudinger, 1892
Dasypolia lama Staudinger, 1896
Dasypolia murina (Menetries, 1848)
Dasypolia templi (Thunberg, 1792)
Dasypolia timoi Fibiger & Nupponen, 2006
Dasypolia tuektiensis Zolotarenko, 1993
Deltote bankiana (Fabricius, 1775)
Deltote deceptoria (Scopoli, 1763)
Deltote delicatula (Christoph, 1882)
Deltote nemorum (Oberthilr, 1880)
Deltote uncula (Clerck, 1759)
Denticucullus pygmina (Haworth, 1809)
Diachrysia bieti (Oberthiir, 1884)
Diachrysia chrysitis (Linnaeus, 1758)
Diachrysia chryson (Esper, 1789)
Diachrysia coreae (Inoue & Sugi, 1958)
Diachrysia generosa (Staudinger, 1900)
Diachrysia leonina (Oberthür, 1884)
Diachrysia nadeja (Oberthür, 1880)
Diachrysia stenochrysis (Warren, 1913)
Diachrysia zosimi (Hübner, [1822])
Diarsia brunnea ([Denis & Schiffermüller], 1775)
Diarsia canescens (Butler, 1878)
Diarsia dahlii (Hübner, [1813])
Diarsia deparca (Butler, 1879)
Diarsia dewitzi (Graeser, [1889])
Diarsia florida (F.Schmidt, 1859)
Diarsia mediotincta I.Kozhantshikov, 1937
Diarsia mendica (Fabricius, 1775)
Diarsia nipponica Ogata, 1957
Diarsia rubi (Vieweg, 1790)
Diarsia ruficauda (Warren, 1909)
Dichagyris achtalensis (I.Kozhantshikov, 1929)
Dichagyris amoena (Staudinger, 1892)
Dichagyris candelisequa (Denis & Schiffermullter, 1775)
Dichagyris caucasica (Staudinger, 1877)
Dichagyris celebrata (Alphéraky, 1897)
Dichagyris celsicola (Bellier, 1859)
Dichagyris duskei Moberg & Fibiger, 1990
Dichagyris eremicola (Standfuss, 1888)
Dichagyris eureteocles Boursin, 1940
Dichagyris flammatra (Denis & Schiffermullter, 1775)
Dichagyris flavina (Herrich-Schäffer, 1852)
Dichagyris forcipula (Denis & Schiffermullter, 1775)
Dichagyris forficula (Eversmann, 1851)
Dichagyris ignara (Staudinger, 1896)
Dichagyris inexpectata (W. Kozhantschikov, 1925)
Dichagyris iranicola Kodak, 1997
Dichagyris leucomelas (Brandt, 1941)
Dichagyris lutescens (Eversmann, 1844)
Dichagyris lux Fibiger & Nupponen, 2002
Dichagyris multicuspis (Eversmann, 1852)
Dichagyris musiva (Hübner, 1803)
Dichagyris nigrescens (Hofner, 1888)
Dichagyris orientis (Alphéraky, 1882)
Dichagyris petersi (Christoph, 1887)
Dichagyris plumbea (Alphéraky, 1887)
Dichagyris pudica (Staudinger, 1896)
Dichagyris renigera (Hübner, [1808])
Dichagyris signifera ([Denis & Schiffermüller], 1775)
Dichagyris spissilinea (Staudinger, 1897)
Dichagyris squalidior (Staudinger, 1901)
Dichagyris squalorum (Eversmann, 1856)
Dichagyris stentzi (Lederer, 1853)
Dichagyris terminicincta (Corti, 1933)
Dichagyris triangularis (Moore, 1867)
Dichagyris truculenta (Lederer, 1853)
Dichagyris tyrannus (Bang-Haas, 1912)
Dichagyris vallesiaca (Boisduval, 1837)
Dichonia aeruginea (Hübner, [1808])
Dichonia convergens ([Denis & Schiffermüller], 1775)
Dicycla oo (Linnaeus, 1758)
Diloba caeruleocephala (Linnaeus, 1758)
Dimorphicosmia variegata (Oberthür, 1879)
Diomea cremata (Butler, 1878)
Diomea jankowskii (Oberthiir, 1880)
Dioszeghyana mirabilis (Sugi, 1955)
Divaena haywardi (Tams, 1926)
Doerriesa striata Staudinger, 1900
Drasteria cailino (Lefebvre, 1827)
Drasteria catocalis (Staudinger, 1882)
Drasteria caucasica (Kolenati, 1846)
Drasteria flexuosa (Menetries, 1848)
Drasteria herzi (Alphéraky, 1892)
Drasteria mongoliensis Wiltshire, 1969
Drasteria picta (Christoph, 1877)
Drasteria pulverosa Wiltshire, 1969
Drasteria rada (Boisduval, 1848)
Drasteria saisani (Staudinger, 1882)
Drasteria scolopax (Alphéraky, 1892)
Drasteria sesquistria (Eversmann, 1854)
Drasteria tenera (Staudinger, 1877)
Dryobotodes carbonis (Wagner, 1931)
Dryobotodes eremita (Fabricius, 1775)
Dryobotodes pryeri (Leech, 1900)
Dypterygia andreji Kardakoff, 1928
Dypterygia caliginosa (Walker, 1858)
Dypterygia scabriuscula (Linnaeus, 1758)
Dysgonia algira (Linnaeus, 1767)
Dysgonia coreana (Leech, 1889)
Dysgonia dulcis (Butler, 1878)
Dysgonia mandschuriana (Staudinger, 1892)
Dysgonia obscura (Bremer & Grey, 1853)
Dysgonia rogenhoferi (Bohatsch, 1880)
Dysgonia stuposa (Fabricius, 1794)
Dysmilichia gemella (Leech, 1889)
Earias clorana (Linnaeus, 1761)
Earias pudicana Staudinger, 1887
Earias rjabovi Filipjev, 1933
Earias roseifera Butler, 1881
Earias roseoviridis Sugi, 1982
Earias vernana (Fabricius, 1787)
Edessena hamada (R.Felder & Rogenhofer, 1874)
Egira anatolica (Hering, 1933)
Egira conspicillaris (Linnaeus, 1758)
Elaphria venustula (Hübner, 1790)
Eligma narcissus (Cramer, 1775)
Enargia abluta (Hübner, [1808])
Enargia paleacea (Esper, 1788)
Enispa albosignata (Staudinger, 1892)
Enispa bimaculata (Staudinger, 1892)
Enispa lutefascialis (Leech, 1889)
Enterpia laudeti (Boisduval, 1840)
Enterpia picturata (Alphéraky, 1882)
Eogena contaminei (Eversmann, 1847)
Epilecta linogrisea ([Denis & Schiffermüller], 1775)
Epimecia ustula (Freyer, 1835)
Epipsilia grisescens (Fabricius, 1794)
Epipsilia latens (Hübner, [1809])
Episema glaucina (Esper, 1789)
Episema korsakovi (Christoph, 1885)
Episema lederi Christoph, 1&85
Episema tersa ([Denis & Schiffermüller], 1775)
Erastroides fentoni (Butler, 1881)
Erebus macrops (Linnaeus, 1758)
Eremobia ochroleuca ([Denis & Schiffermüller], 1775)
Erythroplusia pyropia (Butler, 1879)
Erythroplusia rutilifrons (Walker, 1858)
Estimata alexii W. Kozhantschikov, 1928
Estimata herrichschaefferi (Alphéraky, 1895)
Estimata militzae (I.Kozhantshikov, 1947)
Estimata oschi (О. Bang-Haas, 1922)
Eublemma amasina (Eversmann, 1842)
Eublemma amoena (Hübner, [1803])
Eublemma debilis (Christoph, 1884)
Eublemma gratissima (Staudinger, 1892)
Eublemma minutata (Fabricius, 1794)
Eublemma ostrina (Hübner, 1790)
Eublemma pallidula (Herrich-Schäffer, 1856)
Eublemma panonica (Freyer, 1840)
Eublemma parallela (Freyer, 1842)
Eublemma parva (Hübner, [1808])
Eublemma polygramma (Duponchel, 1842)
Eublemma porphyrinia (Freyer, 1845)
Eublemma pudorina (Staudinger, 1889)
Eublemma pulchralis (De Villers, 1789)
Eublemma purpurina ([Denis & Schiffermüller], 1775)
Eublemma pusilla (Eversmann, 1834)
Eublemma rosea (Hübner, 1790)
Eucarta amethystina (Hübner, [1803])
Eucarta arcta (Lederer, 1853)
Eucarta arctides (Staudinger, 1888)
Eucarta fasciata (Butler, 1878)
Eucarta virgo (Treitschke, 1835)
Euchalcia altaica Dufay, 1968
Euchalcia armeniae Dufay, 1966
Euchalcia biezankoi (Alberti, 1965)
Euchalcia consona (Fabricius, 1787)
Euchalcia cuprescens Dufay, 1966
Euchalcia modestoides Poole, 1989
Euchalcia renardi (Eversmann, 1844)
Euchalcia sergia (Oberthür, 1884)
Euchalcia siderifera (Eversmann, 1846)
Euchalcia variabilis (Piller, 1783)
Euclidia dentata Staudinger, 1871
Euclidia glyphica (Linnaeus, 1758)
Eudocima falonia (Linnaeus, 1763)
Eudocima tyrannus (Guenée, 1852)
Eugnorisma chaldaica (Boisduval, 1840)
Eugnorisma depuncta (Linnaeus, 1761)
Eugnorisma eminens (Lederer, 1855)
Eugnorisma ignoratum Varga & L. Ronkay, 1994
Eugnorisma insignata (Lederer, 1853)
Eugnorisma miniago (Freyer, 1839)
Eugnorisma puengeleri Varga & L. Ronkay, 1987
Eugnorisma trigonica (Alphéraky, 1882)
Eugraphe senescens (Staudinger, 1881)
Eugraphe sigma ([Denis & Schiffermüller], 1775)
Eugraphe versuta (Pungeler, 1908)
Euplexia koreaeplexia Bryk, 1948
Euplexia lucipara (Linnaeus, 1758)
Eupsilia boursini Sugi, 1958
Eupsilia contracta (Butler, 1878)
Eupsilia kurenzovi Kononenko, 1976
Eupsilia transversa (Hufnagel, 1766)
Eurois occulta (Linnaeus, 1758)
Euromoia mixta Staudinger, 1892
Euromoia subpulchra (Alphéraky, 1897)
Eutelia adoratrix (Staudinger, 1892)
Eutelia adulatricoides (Mell, 1943)
Eutelia adulatrix (Hübner, [1813])
Eutelia geyeri (R.Felder & Rogenhofer, 1874)
Euxoa acuminifera (Eversmann, 1854)
Euxoa adumbrata (Eversmann, 1842)
Euxoa anatolica Draudt, 1936
Euxoa aquilina ([Denis & Schiffermüller], 1775)
Euxoa basigramma (Staudinger, 1870)
Euxoa birivia ([Denis & Schiffermüller], 1775)
Euxoa centralis (Staudinger, 1889)
Euxoa christophi (Staudinger, 1870)
Euxoa churchillensis McDunnough, 1932
Euxoa conifera (Christoph, 1877)
Euxoa conspicua (Hübner,[1824])
Euxoa cos (Hübner, [1824])
Euxoa cursoria (Hufnagel, 1766)
Euxoa decora ([Denis & Schiffermüller], 1775)
Euxoa decorans (Staudinger, 1896)
Euxoa deficiens (Wagner, 1913)
Euxoa deserta (Staudinger, 1870)
Euxoa diaphora Boursin, 1928
Euxoa distinguenda (Lederer, 1857)
Euxoa dsheiron Brandt, 1938
Euxoa emolliens Warren, 1909
Euxoa eruta (Hübner, [1827])
Euxoa fallax (Eversmann, 1854)
Euxoa filipjevi I.Kozhantshikov, 1929
Euxoa fissa Staudinger, 1895
Euxoa foeda (Lederer, 1855)
Euxoa glabella Wagner, 1930
Euxoa goetria I.Kozhantshikov, 1929
Euxoa hastifera (Donzel, 1847)
Euxoa heringi (Staudinger, 1877)
Euxoa hilaris (Freyer, 1838)
Euxoa hyperborea Lafontaine, 1987
Euxoa intolerabilis (Pungeler, 1902)
Euxoa karschi (Graeser, [1890])
Euxoa mustelina (Christoph, 1877)
Euxoa nigricans (Linnaeus, 1761)
Euxoa nigrofusca (Esper,[1788])
Euxoa novoobscurior Bryk, 1948
Euxoa obelisca ([Denis & Schiffermüller], 1775)
Euxoa ochrogaster (Guenée, 1852)
Euxoa phantoma I.Kozhantshikov, 1928
Euxoa recussa (Hübner, [1817])
Euxoa sabuletorum (Boisduval, 1840)
Euxoa segnilis (Duponchel, 1836)
Euxoa sibirica (Boisduval, 1832)
Euxoa temera (Hübner, [1808])
Euxoa triaena I.Kozhantshikov, 1929
Euxoa tristis (Staudinger, 1897)
Euxoa tritici (Linnaeus, 1761)
Euxoa vitta (Esper, 1789)
Euxoa zernyi Boursin, 1944
Evonima mandschuriana (Oberthür, 1880)
Exophyla rectangularis (Geyer, [1828])
Fabula zollikoferi (Freyer, 1836)
Feltia arctica (Kononenko, 1981)
Feltia beringiana Lafontaine, Kononenko & McCabe, 1986
Feltia boreana Lafontaine, 1986
Feltia honesta (Staudinger, 1892)
Feltia nigrita (Graeser, 1892)
Feralia sauberi (Graeser, 1892)
Gelastocera eminentissima Bryk, 1948
Gelastocera exusta Butler, 1877
Gelastocera kotschbeji Obraztsov, 1943
Gelastocera ochroleucana Staudinger, 1887
Gelastocera sutschana Obraztsov, 1950
Gerbathodes paupera (Staudinger, 1892)
Gonepatica opalina (Butler, 1879)
Gonospileia munita (Hübner, [1813])
Gonospileia triquetra ([Denis & Schiffermüller], 1775)
Gortyna basalipunctata Graeser, [1889]
Gortyna borelii (Pierret, 1837)
Gortyna flavago ([Denis & Schiffermüller], 1775)
Gortyna fortis (Butler, 1878)
Gortyna hethitica Hacker, Kuhna & Gross, 1986
Grammodes bifasciata (Petagna, 1787)
Grammodes stolida (Fabricius, 1775)
Graphiphora augur (Fabricius, 1775)
Griposia aprilina (Linnaeus, 1758)
Griposia pinkeri (Kobes, 1973)
Gynaephila maculifera Staudinger, 1892
Gyrospilara formosa (Graeser, [1889])
Hada persa (Alphéraky, 1897)
Hada plebeja (Linnaeus, 1761)
Hadena aberrans (Eversmann, 1856)
Hadena albertii Hacker, 1996
Hadena albimacula (Borkhausen, 1792)
Hadena caesia ([Denis & Schiffermüller], 1775)
Hadena capsincola ([Denis & Schiffermüller], 1775)
Hadena christophi (Moschler, 1862)
Hadena clara (Staudinger, 1901)
Hadena compta ([Denis & Schiffermüller], 1775)
Hadena confusa (Hufnagel, 1766)
Hadena consparcatoides (Schawerda, 1928)
Hadena corrupta (Herz, 1898)
Hadena dianthoecioides (Boursin, 1940)
Hadena drenowskii (Rebel, 1930)
Hadena femina Hacker, 1996
Hadena filograna (Esper, [1788])
Hadena irregularis (Hufnagel, 1766)
Hadena kurajica Hacker, 1996
Hadena luteocincta (Rambur, 1834)
Hadena magnolii (Boisduval, 1829)
Hadena melanochroa (Staudinger, 1892)
Hadena perplexa ([Denis & Schiffermüller], 1775)
Hadena persimilis Hacker, 1996
Hadena pseudodealbata Hacker, 1988
Hadena pseudohyrcana de Freina & Hacker, 1985
Hadena scythia Kljutschko & Hacker, 1996
Hadena secreta Hacker, 1996
Hadena silenes (Hübner, [1822])
Hadena strouhali (Boursin, 1955)
Hadena syriaca (Osthelder, 1933)
Hadena tephroleuca (Boisduval, 1833)
Hadena variolata (Smith, 1888)
Hadennia incongruens (Butler, 1879)
Haderonia optima (Alphéraky, 1897)
Hadjina lutosa Staudinger, 1892
Haemerosia vassilininei Bang-Haas, 1912
Harutaeographa stenoptera (Staudinger, 1892)
Hecatera accurata (Christoph, 1882)
Hecatera bicolorata (Hufnagel, 1766)
Hecatera cappa (Hübner, [1809])
Hecatera dysodea ([Denis & Schiffermüller], 1775)
Hedina deccerti (Hampson, 1908)
Hedina decipiens (Alphéraky, 1895)
Helicoverpa armigera (Hübner, [1808])
Helicoverpa assulta (Guenée, 1852)
Heliocheilus fervens (Butler, 1881)
Heliothis incarnata (Fraser, 1838)
Heliothis maritima Graslin, 1855
Heliothis nubigera Herrich-Schäffer, 1851
Heliothis ononis ([Denis & Schiffermüller], 1775)
Heliothis peltigera ([Denis & Schiffermüller], 1775)
Heliothis viriplaca (Hufnagel, 1766)
Helotropha leucostigma (Hübner, [1808])
Hepatica anceps Staudinger, 1892
Heraema mandschurica Graeser, [1890]
Herminia arenosa Butler, 1878
Herminia dolosa Butler, 1879
Herminia grisealis ([Denis & Schiffermüller], 1775)
Herminia robiginosa (Staudinger, 1888)
Herminia stramentacealis Bremer, 1864
Herminia tarsicrinalis (Knoch, 1782)
Hermonassa arenosa (Butler, 1881)
Hermonassa cecilia Butler, 1878
Hillia iris (Zetterstedt, 1839)
Himalistra evelina (Butler, 1879)
Holocryptis nymphula (Rebel, 1909)
Holocryptis ussuriensis (Rebel, 1901)
Hoplodrina ambigua ([Denis & Schiffermüller], 1775)
Hoplodrina blanda ([Denis & Schiffermüller], 1775)
Hoplodrina euryptera Boursin, 1937
Hoplodrina octogenaria (Goeze, 1781)
Hoplodrina pfeifferi (Boursin, 1932)
Hoplodrina respersa ([Denis & Schiffermüller], 1775)
Hoplodrina superstes (Ochsenheimer, 1816)
Hyalobole albimacula (Kononenko, 1978)
Hydraecia micacea (Esper, 1789)
Hydraecia mongoliensis Urbahn, 1967
Hydraecia nordstroemi Horke, 1952
Hydraecia osseola Staudinger, 1882
Hydraecia petasitis Doubleday, 1847
Hydraecia praecipua Hacker & Nekrasov, 2001
Hydraecia ultima Holst, 1965
Hydrillodes morosa (Butler, 1879)
Hypena amica Butler, 1878
Hypena bicoloralis Graeser, [1889]
Hypena bipartita Staudinger, 1892
Hypena claripennis Butler, 1878
Hypena conspersalis Staudinger, 1888
Hypena crassalis (Fabricius, 1787)
Hypena kengkalis Bremer, 1864
Hypena munitalis Mann, 1861
Hypena narratalis Walker, 1858
Hypena nigrobasalis (Herz, 1904)
Hypena obesalis Treitschke, 1829
Hypena opulenta (Christoph, 1877)
Hypena palpalis (Hübner, 1796)
Hypena proboscidalis (Linnaeus, 1758)
Hypena rostralis (Linnaeus, 1758)
Hypena semialbata Sugi, 1982
Hypena squalida (Butler, 1878)
Hypena stygiana Butler, 1878
Hypena tamsi Filipjev, 1927
Hypena tatorhina Butler, 1878
Hypena tristalis Lederer, 1853
Hypena zilla Butler, 1879
Hypenodes humidalis Doubleday, 1850
Hypenodes orientalis Staudinger, 1901
Hypenodes rectifascia Sugi, 1982
Hyperstrotia flavipuncta (Leech, 1889)
Hypersypnoides astrigera (Butler, 1885)
Hypobarathra icterias (Eversmann, 1843)
Hypocala deflorata (Fabricius, 1794)
Hypocala subsatura Guenée, 1852
Hypocala violacea Butler, 1879
Hypocoena stigmatica (Eversmann, 1855)
Hypostrotia cinerea (Butler, 1878)
Hyppa rectilinea (Esper, 1788)
Hyssia cavernosa (Eversmann, 1842)
Idia calvaria ([Denis & Schiffermüller], 1775)
Idia curvipalpis (Butler, 1879)
Idia quadra (Graeser, [1889])
Imosca coreana (Matsumura, 1926)
Ipimorpha contusa (Freyer, 1849)
Ipimorpha retusa (Linnaeus, 1761)
Ipimorpha subtusa ([Denis & Schiffermüller], 1775)
Iragaodes nobilis (Staudinger, 1887)
Isochlora daghestana Hreblay & L Ronkay, 1998
Isochlora grumi Alphéraky, 1892
Isochlora herbacea Alphéraky, 1895
Isochlora sericea (Lafontaine & Kononenko, 1996)
Isochlora viridis Staudinger, 1882
Jodia croceago ([Denis & Schiffermüller], 1775)
Jodia sericea (Butler, 1878)
Karana laetevirens (Oberthiir, 1884)
Kerala decipiens (Butler, 1878)
Koyaga falsa (Butler, 1885)
Koyaga numisma (Staudinger, 1888)
Lacanobia aliena (Hübner, [1808])
Lacanobia blenna (Hübner, [1824])
Lacanobia contigua ([Denis & Schiffermüller], 1775)
Lacanobia contrastata (Bryk, 1942)
Lacanobia dentata (Kononenko, 1981)
Lacanobia mongolica Behounek, 1992
Lacanobia oleracea (Linnaeus, 1758)
Lacanobia praedita (Hübner, [1813])
Lacanobia splendens (Hübner, [1808])
Lacanobia suasa ([Denis & Schiffermüller], 1775)
Lacanobia thalassina (Hufnagel, 1766)
Lacanobia w-latinum (Hufnagel, 1766)
Lamprotes c-aureum (Knoch, 1781)
Lamprotes mikadina (Butler, 1878)
Lasianobia lauta (Pungeler, 1900)
Lasionycta alpicola Lafontaine & Kononenko, 1988
Lasionycta buraetica Kononenko, 1988
Lasionycta corax Kononenko, 1988
Lasionycta draudti (Wagner, 1936)
Lasionycta hampsoni Varga, 1974
Lasionycta hospita Bang-Haas, 1912
Lasionycta imbecilla (Fabricius, 1794)
Lasionycta impar (Staudinger, 1870)
Lasionycta leucocycla (Staudinger, 1857)
Lasionycta orientalis (Alphéraky, 1882)
Lasionycta proxima (Hübner, [1809])
Lasionycta secedens (Walker, 1858)
Lasionycta skraelingia (Herrich-Schäffer, 1852)
Lasionycta staudingeri (Aurivillius, 1891)
Laspeyria flexula ([Denis & Schiffermüller], 1775)
Lateroligia ophiogramma (Esper, 1794)
Lenisa geminipuncta (Haworth, 1809)
Leucania comma (Linnaeus, 1761)
Leucania herrichi Herrich-Schäffer, 1849
Leucania loreyi (Duponchel, 1827)
Leucania obsoleta (Hübner, 1803)
Leucania punctosa (Treitschke, 1825)
Leucania zeae (Duponchel, 1827)
Leucapamea askoldis (Oberthür, 1880)
Leucapamea kawadai (Sugi, 1955)
Leucochlaena fallax (Staudinger, 1870)
Leucochlaena muscosa (Staudinger, 1891)
Leucomelas juvenilis (Bremer, 1861)
Lithacodia martjanovi (Tschetverikov, 1904)
Lithomoia solidaginis (Hübner, [1803])
Lithophane consocia (Borkhausen, 1792)
Lithophane furcifera (Hufnagel, 1766)
Lithophane lamda (Fabricius, 1787)
Lithophane lapidea (Hübner, [1808])
Lithophane ornitopus (Hufnagel, 1766)
Lithophane pacifica Kononenko, 1978
Lithophane plumbealis (Matsumura, 1926)
Lithophane pruinosa (Butler, 1878)
Lithophane rosinae (Piingeler, 1906)
Lithophane semibrunnea (Haworth, 1809)
Lithophane socia (Hufnagel, 1766)
Lithophane ustulata (Butler, 1878)
Lithophane venusta (Leech, 1889)
Litoligia fodinae (Oberthür, 1880)
Litoligia literosa (Haworth, 1809)
Longalatedes elymi (Treitschke, 1825)
Lophomilia flaviplaga (Warren, 1912)
Luperina diversa (Staudinger, 1892)
Luperina rjabovi Kljutschko, 1967
Luperina rubella (Duponchel, 1835)
Luperina taurica (Kljutschko, 1967)
Luperina testacea ([Denis & Schiffermüller], 1775)
Lycophotia cissigma (Menetries, 1859)
Lycophotia molothina (Esper, 1789)
Lycophotia porphyrea ([Denis & Schiffermüller], 1775)
Lygephila craccae ([Denis & Schiffermüller], 1775)
Lygephila emaculata (Graeser, 1892)
Lygephila lubrica (Freyer, 1842)
Lygephila ludicra (Hübner, 1790)
Lygephila lusoria (Linnaeus, 1758)
Lygephila maxima (Bremer, 1861)
Lygephila minima Pekarsky, 2013
Lygephila mirabilis (Bryk, 1948)
Lygephila nigricostata (Graeser, 1890)
Lygephila pastinum (Treitschke, 1826)
Lygephila procax (Hübner, [1813])
Lygephila recta (Bremer, 1864)
Lygephila viciae (Hilbner, [1822])
Lygephila vulcanea (Butler, 1881)
Macdunnoughia confusa (Stephens, 1850)
Macdunnoughia crassisigna (Warren, 1913)
Macdunnoughia hybrida L. Ronkay, 1986
Macdunnoughia purissima (Butler, 1878)
Macrochilo cribrumalis (Hübner, 1793)
Macrochtonia fervens Butler, 1881
Maliattha bella (Staudinger, 1888)
Maliattha chalcogramma (Bryk, 1948)
Maliattha khasanica Zolotarenko & Dubatolov, 1996
Maliattha rosacea (Leech, 1889)
Mamestra brassicae (Linnaeus, 1758)
Megalodes eximia (Freyer, 1845)
Meganephria bimaculosa (Linnaeus, 1767)
Meganephria cinerea (Butler, 1881)
Meganephria extensa (Butler, 1879)
Meganephria kononenkoi Poole, 1989
Meganephria parki L. Ronkay & Kononenko, 1998
Meganephria tancrei (Graeser, [1889])
Melanchra persicariae (Linnaeus, 1761)
Melanchra postalba Sugi, 1982
Melapia electaria (Bremer, 1864)
Mesapamea concinnata Heinicke, 1959
Mesapamea moderata (Eversmann, 1843)
Mesapamea secalella Remm, 1983
Mesapamea secalis (Linnaeus, 1758)
Mesogona acetosellae ([Denis & Schiffermüller], 1775)
Mesogona oxalina (Hübner, [1803])
Mesoligia furuncula ([Denis & Schiffermüller], 1775)
Mesotrosta signalis (Treitschke, 1829)
Metachrostis obliquisigna Hampson, 1894
Metoponrhis albirena (Christoph, 1887)
Metopoplus boursini Brandt, 1938
Metopoplus excelsa Christoph, 1885
Metopta rectifasciata (Menetries, 1863)
Micardia pulchra Butler, 1878
Mimeusemia persimilis Butler, 1875
Minucia lunaris ([Denis & Schiffermüller], 1775)
Mniotype adusta (Esper, 1790)
Mniotype bathensis (Lutzau, 1901)
Mniotype japonica Draudt, 1935
Mniotype melanodonta (Hampson, 1906)
Mniotype satura ([Denis & Schiffermüller], 1775)
Mocis ancilla (Warren, 1913)
Mocis annetta (Butler, 1878)
Mocis frugalis (Fabricius, 1775)
Mocis undata (Fabricius, 1775)
Moma alpium (Osbeck, 1778)
Moma kolthoffi (Bryk, 1948)
Moma tsushimana Sugi, 1982
Mormo maura (Linnaeus, 1758)
Mormo muscivirens Butler, 1878
Mycteroplus puniceago (Boisduval, 1840)
Mythimna albipuncta ([Denis & Schiffermüller], 1775)
Mythimna albiradiosa (Eversmann, 1852)
Mythimna alopecuri (Boisduval, 1840)
Mythimna andereggii (Boisduval, 1840)
Mythimna atrata Remm & Viidalep, 1979
Mythimna chosenicola (Bryk, 1948)
Mythimna congrua (Hübner, [1817])
Mythimna conigera ([Denis & Schiffermüller], 1775)
Mythimna curvata Leech, 1900
Mythimna deserticola (Bartel, 1903)
Mythimna divergens Butler, 1878
Mythimna ferrago (Fabricius, 1787)
Mythimna flavostigma (Bremer, 1861)
Mythimna grandis Butler, 1878
Mythimna impura (Hübner, [1808])
Mythimna inanis (Oberthür, 1880)
Mythimna l-album (Linnaeus, 1767)
Mythimna monticola Sugi, 1958
Mythimna opaca (Staudinger, 1900)
Mythimna pallens (Linnaeus, 1758)
Mythimna placida Butler, 1878
Mythimna postica (Hampson, 1905)
Mythimna pudorina ([Denis & Schiffermüller], 1775)
Mythimna radiata (Bremer, 1861)
Mythimna rufipennis Butler, 1878
Mythimna sassanidica (Hacker, 1986)
Mythimna separata (Walker, 1865)
Mythimna simplex (Leech, 1889)
Mythimna straminea (Treitschke, 1825)
Mythimna turca (Linnaeus, 1761)
Mythimna unipuncta (Haworth, 1809)
Mythimna velutina (Eversmann, 1846)
Mythimna vitellina (Hübner, 1808)
Nacna malachitis (Oberthür, 1880)
Naenia contaminata (Walker, 1865)
Naenia typica (Linnaeus, 1758)
Naganoella timandra (Alphéraky, 1897)
Naranga aenescens Moore, 1881
Negritothripa hampsoni (Wileman, 1911)
Netrocerocora quadrangula (Eversmann, 1844)
Neustrotia costimacula (Oberthür, 1880)
Neustrotia noloides (Butler, 1879)
Niphonyx segregata (Butler, 1878)
Noctua comes Hübner, [1813]
Noctua fimbriata (Schreber, 1759)
Noctua interjecta Hübner, [1803]
Noctua interposita (Hübner, 1790)
Noctua janthe (Borkhausen, 1792)
Noctua janthina ([Denis & Schiffermüller], 1775)
Noctua orbona (Hufnagel, 1766)
Noctua pronuba Linnaeus, 1758
Nola aerugula (Hübner, 1793)
Nola chlamitulalis (Hübner, [1813])
Nola cicatricalis (Treitschke, 1835)
Nola confusalis (Herrich-Schäffer, 1847)
Nola costimacula Staudinger, 1887
Nola crambiformis Rebel, 1902
Nola cristatula (Hübner, 1793)
Nola cucullatella (Linnaeus, 1758)
Nola emi (Inoue, 1956)
Nola innocua Butler, 1880
Nola jjaponibia Strand, 1920
Nola karelica (Tengstrom, 1869)
Nola nami (Inoue, 1956)
Nola neglecta Inoue, 1991
Nola subchlamydula Staudinger, 1871
Nola taeniata Snellen, 1875
Nola turanica Staudinger, 1887
Nolathripa lactaria (Graeser, 1892)
Nonagria puengeleri (Schawerda, 1923)
Nonagria typhae (Thunberg, 1784)
Nycteola asiatica (Krulikowsky, 1904)
Nycteola columbana (Turner, 1925)
Nycteola degenerana (Hübner, 1799)
Nycteola kuldzhana Obraztsov, 1954
Nycteola revayana (Scopoli, 1772)
Nycteola siculana (Fuchs, 1899)
Nyssocnemis eversmanni (Lederer, 1853)
Ochropleura plecta (Linnaeus, 1761)
Odice arcuinna (Hübner, 1790)
Oligia fasciuncula (Haworth, 1809)
Oligia latruncula ([Denis & Schiffermüller], 1775)
Oligia leuconephra Hampson, 1908
Oligia pseudodubia Rezbanyai-Reser, 1997
Oligia strigilis (Linnaeus, 1758)
Oligia vandarban Rezbanyai-Reser, 1997
Oligia versicolor (Borkhausen, 1792)
Oligonyx vulnerata (Butler, 1878)
Olivenebula oberthueri (Staudinger, 1892)
Omphalophana antirrhinii (Hübner, [1803])
Omphalophana durnalayana Osthelder, 1933
Oncocnemis campicola Lederer, 1853
Oncocnemis confusa (Freyer, 1842)
Oncocnemis exacta Christoph, 1887
Oncocnemis kaszabi L. Ronkay, 1988
Oncocnemis nigricula (Eversmann, 1847)
Oncocnemis senica (Eversmann, 1856)
Oncocnemis strioligera Lederer, 1853
Ophiusa tirhaca (Cramer, 1773)
Opigena polygona ([Denis & Schiffermüller], 1775)
Oraesia emarginata (Fabricius, 1794)
Oraesia excavata (Butler, 1878)
Orbona fragariae (Vieweg, 1790)
Oria musculosa (Hübner, [1808])
Orthogonia sera Felder & R.Felder, 1862
Orthosia ariuna Hreblay, 1991
Orthosia askoldensis (Staudinger, 1892)
Orthosia carnipennis (Butler, 1878)
Orthosia cedemarki (Bryk, 1948)
Orthosia cerasi (Fabricius, 1775)
Orthosia coniortota (Filipjev, 1927)
Orthosia cruda ([Denis & Schiffermüller], 1775)
Orthosia ella (Butler, 1878)
Orthosia evanida (Butler, 1879)
Orthosia gothica (Linnaeus, 1758)
Orthosia gracilis ([Denis & Schiffermüller], 1775)
Orthosia incerta (Hufnagel, 1766)
Orthosia lizetta (Butler, 1878)
Orthosia miniosa ([Denis & Schiffermüller], 1775)
Orthosia odiosa (Butler, 1878)
Orthosia opima (Hübner, [1809])
Orthosia paromoea (Hampson, 1905)
Orthosia populeti (Fabricius, 1775)
Orthosia satoi Sugi, 1960
Orthosia sordescens Hreblay, 1993
Orthosia ussuriana Kononenko, 1988
Oruza mira (Butler, 1879)
Oruza yoshinoensis Wileman, 1911
Oxicesta geographica (Fabricius, 1787)
Oxytripia orbiculosa (Esper, 1799)
Pabulatrix pabulatricula (Brahm, 1791)
Pachetra sagittigera (Hufnagel, 1766)
Panchrysia deaurata (Esper, 1787)
Panchrysia dives (Eversmann, 1844)
Panchrysia ornata (Bremer, 1864)
Panemeria tenebrata (Scopoli, 1763)
Pangrapta costaemacula Staudinger, 1888
Pangrapta flavomacula Staudinger, 1888
Pangrapta griseola Staudinger, 1892
Pangrapta lunulata Stertz, 1915
Pangrapta marmorata Staudinger, 1888
Pangrapta obscurata (Butler, 1879)
Pangrapta suaveola Staudinger, 1888
Pangrapta umbrosa (Leech, 1900)
Pangrapta vasava (Butler, 1881)
Panolis flammea ([Denis & Schiffermüller], 1775)
Panthauma egregia Staudinger, 1892
Panthea coenobita (Esper, 1785)
Papestra biren (Goeze, 1781)
Parabarrovia keelei Gibson, 1920
Paracolax albinotata (Butler, 1879)
Paracolax fascialis (Leech, 1889)
Paracolax fentoni (Butler, 1879)
Paracolax trilinealis (Bremer, 1864)
Paracolax tristalis (Fabricius, 1794)
Paradiarsia coturnicola (Graeser, 1892)
Paradiarsia punicea (Hübner, [1803])
Paragabara flavomacula (Oberthür, 1880)
Paragabara ochreipennis Sugi, 1962
Paragabara secunda Remm, 1983
Paragona cognata (Staudinger, 1892)
Paragona multisignata (Christoph, 1881)
Paraphyllophylla confusa Kononenko, 1985
Parascotia fuliginaria (Linnaeus, 1761)
Parastichtis suspecta (Hübner, 1817)
Parhylophila buddhae (Alphéraky, 1879)
Parhylophila celsiana (Staudinger, 1887)
Pechipogo plumigeralis Hübner, [1825])
Pechipogo strigilata (Linnaeus, 1758)
Pericyma albidentaria (Freyer, 1842)
Peridroma saucia (Hübner, [1808])
Perigrapha circumducta (Lederer, 1855)
Perigrapha extincta Kononenko, 1989
Perigrapha hoenei Pungeler, 1914
Perigrapha i-cinctum ([Denis & Schiffermüller], 1775)
Perigrapha rorida (Frivaldszky, 1835)
Periphanes delphinii (Linnaeus, 1758)
Periphanes treitschkei (Frivaldszky, 1835)
Periphanes victorina (Sodoffsky, 1849)
Phidrimana amurensis (Staudinger, 1892)
Phlogophora aureopuncta (Hampson, 1908)
Phlogophora beatrix Butler, 1878
Phlogophora illustrata (Graeser, [1889])
Phlogophora meticulosa (Linnaeus, 1758)
Phlogophora scita (Hübner, 1790)
Phoebophilus veternosa (Pungeler, 1907)
Photedes captiuncula (Treitschke, 1825)
Photedes extrema (Hübner, [1809])
Photedes fluxa (Hübner, [1809])
Photedes improba (Staudinger, 1898)
Photedes minima (Haworth, 1809)
Phragmatiphila nexa (Hübner, [1808])
Phyllophila obliterata (Rambur, 1833)
Phytometra amata (Butler, 1879)
Phytometra viridaria (Clerck, 1759)
Plusia festucae (Linnaeus, 1758)
Plusia putnami (Grote, 1873)
Plusidia cheiranthi (Tauscher, 1809)
Plusilla rosalia Staudinger, 1892
Plusiodonta casta (Butler, 1878)
Polia altaica (Lederer, 1853)
Polia bombycina (Hufnagel, 1766)
Polia conspicua (Bang-Haas, 1912)
Polia goliath (Oberthür, 1880)
Polia hepatica (Clerck, 1759)
Polia lama (Staudinger, 1896)
Polia lamuta (Herz, 1903)
Polia malchani (Draudt, 1934)
Polia mortua (Staudinger, 1888)
Polia nebulosa (Hufnagel, 1766)
Polia richardsoni (Curtis, 1834)
Polia serratilinea Ochsenheimer, 1816
Polia tiefi Pungeler, 1914
Polia vespertilio (Draudt, 1934)
Polychrysia aurata (Staudinger, 1888)
Polychrysia esmeralda (Oberthür, 1880)
Polychrysia moneta (Fabricius, 1787)
Polychrysia sica (Graeser, [1890])
Polychrysia splendida (Butler, 1878)
Polymixis atossa (Wiltshire, 1941)
Polymixis latesco Fibiger, 2001
Polymixis mandschurica Boursin, 1970
Polymixis polymita (Linnaeus, 1761)
Polymixis rosinae (Bohatsch, 1908)
Polymixis rufocincta (Geyer, 1828)
Polymixis trisignata (Menetries, 1847)
Polyphaenis viridis (De Villers, 1789)
Polypogon gryphalis (Herrich-Schäffer, 1851)
Polypogon tentacularia (Linnaeus, 1758)
Polysciera manleyi (Leech, 1900)
Prognorisma albifurca (Erschoff, 1877)
Prometopus flavicollis (Leech, 1889)
Prospalta cyclica (Hampson, 1908)
Protarchanara brevilinea (Fenn, 1864)
Protodeltote distinguenda (Staudinger, 1888)
Protodeltote pygarga (Hufnagel, 1766)
Protodeltote wiscotti (Staudinger, 1888)
Protolampra sobrina (Duponchel, 1843)
Protoschinia scutosa ([Denis & Schiffermüller], 1775)
Protoschrankia ijimai Sugi, 1979
Pseudeustrotia candidula ([Denis & Schiffermüller], 1775)
Pseudluperina pozzii (Curo, 1883)
Pseudocosmia maculata Kononenko, 1985
Pseudodeltote brunnea (Leech, 1889)
Pseudohadena arenacea L. Ronkay, Varga & Fabian, 1995
Pseudohadena argyllostigma (Varga & L. Ronkay, 1991)
Pseudohadena clementissima L. Ronkay & Varga, 1993
Pseudohadena commoda (Staudinger, 1889)
Pseudohadena cymatodes Boursin, 1954
Pseudohadena gnorima (Pilngeler, 1907)
Pseudohadena igorkostjuki L. Ronkay, Varga & Fabian, 1995
Pseudohadena immunda (Eversmann, 1842)
Pseudohadena immunis (Staudinger, 1889)
Pseudohadena minuta (Pungeler, 1899)
Pseudohadena pugnax (Alphéraky, 1892)
Pseudohadena stenoptera (Boursin, 1970)
Pseudohermonassa melancholica (Lederer, 1853)
Pseudohermonassa ononensis (Bremer, 1861)
Pseudohermonassa velata (Staudinger, 1888)
Pseudoips prasinana (Linnaeus, 1758)
Pseudoips sylpha (Butler, 1879)
Pseudopanolis heterogyna (Bang-Haas, 1927)
Pygopteryx suava Staudinger, 1887
Pyrocleptria cora (Eversrnan, 1837)
Pyrrhia bifasciata (Staudinger, 1888)
Pyrrhia exprimens (Walker, 1857)
Pyrrhia hedemanni (Staudinger, 1892)
Pyrrhia purpurina (Esper, 1804)
Pyrrhia umbra (Hufnagel, 1766)
Pyrrhidivalva sordida (Butler, 1881)
Raphia peustera Pungeler, 1906
Resapamea hedeni (Graeser, [1889])
Resapamea vaskeni (Varga, 1979)
Rhizedra lutosa (Hübner, [1803])
Rhyacia arenacea (Hampson, 1907)
Rhyacia caradrinoides (Staudinger, 1897)
Rhyacia helvetina (Boisduval, 1833)
Rhyacia junonia (Staudinger, 1881)
Rhyacia ledereri (Erschoff, 1870)
Rhyacia lucipeta ([Denis & Schiffermüller], 1775)
Rhyacia nyctymerides (О. Bang-Haas, 1922)
Rhyacia simulans (Hufnagel, 1766)
Rhynchopalpus albula ([Denis & Schiffermüller], 1775)
Rhynchopalpus banghaasi (West, 1925)
Rhynchopalpus basifascia (Inoue, 1958)
Rhynchopalpus bryophilaris (Staudinger, 1887)
Rhynchopalpus costalis (Staudinger, 1887)
Rhynchopalpus fumosa (Butler, 1879)
Rhynchopalpus gigantula (Staudinger, 1879)
Rhynchopalpus gigas (Butler, 1884)
Rhynchopalpus mikabo Inoue, 1970
Rhynchopalpus pulchella Leech, 1889
Rhynchopalpus satoi Inoue, 1970
Rhynchopalpus shimekii (Inoue, 1970)
Rhynchopalpus strigula ([Denis & Schiffermüller], 1775)
Rhynchopalpus strigulosa (Staudinger, 1887)
Rhynchopalpus subgigas Inoue, 1982
Rhynchopalpus togatulalis (Hübner, 1798)
Rivula sericealis (Scopoli, 1763)
Rivula unctalis Staudinger, 1892 8499
Rotoa distincta (Bang-Haas, 1912)
Rusina ferruginea (Esper, [1787])
Sajania devagor (W. Kozhantschikov, 1923)
Sapporia repetita (Butler, 1885)
Saragossa demotica (Pungeler, 1902)
Saragossa incerta (Staudinger, 1896)
Saragossa porosa (Eversmann, 1854)
Saragossa siccanorum (Staudinger, 1870)
Saragossa uralica Hacker & Fibiger, 2002
Sarbanissa subflava (Moore, 1877)
Sarbanissa venusta (Leech, 1889)
Sarcopolia illoba (Butler, 1878)
Schinia bieneri (Rebel, 1926)
Schinia cardui (Hübner, 1790)
Schinia cognata (Fraser, 1833)
Schinia imperialis (Staudinger, 1871)
Schinia purpurascens (1auscher, 1809)
Schinia scutata (Staudinger, 1895)
Schrankia balneorum (Alphéraky, 1880)
Schrankia costaestrigalis (Stephens, 1834)
Schrankia kogii Inoue, 1979
Schrankia separatalis (Herz, 1904)
Schrankia taenialis (Hübner, [1809])
Sclerogenia jessica (Butler, 1878)
Scoliopteryx libatrix (Linnaeus, 1758)
Scotochrosta pulla ([Denis & Schiffermüller], 1775)
Scythocentropus misella (Pungeler, 1907)
Scythocentropus scripturosa (Eversmann, 1854)
Sedina buettneri (Hering, 1858)
Senta flammea (Curtis, 1828)
Serrodes campana Guenée, 1852
Sesamia confusa (Sugi, 1982)
Sesamia cretica Lederer, 1857
Sesamia turpis (Butler, 1879)
Sidemia bremeri (Erschoff, 1870)
Sidemia spilogramma (Rambur, 1871)
Sideridis egena (Lederer, 1853)
Sideridis herczigi Varga & L. Ronkay, 1991
Sideridis honeyi (Yoshimoto, 1989)
Sideridis implexa (Hübner, [1809])
Sideridis incommoda (Staudinger, 1888)
Sideridis kitti (Schawerda, 1914)
Sideridis lampra (Schawerda, 1913)
Sideridis mandarina (Leech, 1900)
Sideridis remmiana Kononenko, 1982
Sideridis reticulata (Goeze, 1781)
Sideridis rivularis (Fabricius, 1775)
Sideridis turbida (Esper, 1790)
Sideridis unica (Leech, 1889)
Sideridis unicolor (Alphéraky, 1889)
Simplicia rectalis (Eversmann, 1842)
Simyra albovenosa (Goeze, 1781)
Simyra dentinosa (Freyer, 1838)
Simyra nervosa ([Denis & Schiffermüller], 1775)
Simyra splendida Staudinger, 1888
Sinarella aegrota (But1er, 1879)
Sinarella cristulalis (Staudinger, 1892)
Sinarella japonica (Butler, 1881)
Sinarella nigrisigna (Leech, 1900)
Sinarella punctalis (Herz, 1904)
Sineugraphe bipartita (Graeser, [1889])
Sineugraphe exusta (Butler, 1878)
Sineugraphe oceanica (Kardakoff, 1928)
Sinna extrema (Walker, 1854)
Sinocharis korbae Piingeler, 1912
Sophta subrosea (Butler, 1881)
Spaelotis lucens Butler, 1881
Spaelotis ravida ([Denis & Schiffermüller], 1775)
Spaelotis senna (Freyer, 1829)
Spaelotis sennina Boursin, 1955
Spaelotis suecica (Aurivillius, 1889)
Sphragifera sigillata (Menetries, 1859)
Spirama helicina (Hübner, [1831])
Spodoptera depravata (Butler, 1879)
Spodoptera exigua (Hübner, [1808])
Spodoptera litura (Fabricius, 1775)
Standfussiana lucernea (Linnaeus, 1758)
Standfussiana nictymera (Boisduval, 1834)
Staurophora celsia (Linnaeus, 1758)
Stenbergmania albomaculalis (Bremer, 1864)
Stenodrina aeschista (Boursin, 1937)
Stenoloba assimilis (Warren, 1909)
Stenoloba jankowskii (Oberthür, 1884)
Stilbina nictitans (Bremer & Grey, 1853)
Stygiodrina maurella (Staudinger, 1888)
Subleuconycta palshkovi (Filipjev, 1937)
Sugia stygia (Butler, 1878)
Sympistis funebris (Hübner, [1809])
Sympistis heliophila (Paykull, 1793)
Sympistis lapponica (Thunberg, 1791)
Sympistis nigrita (Boisduval, 1840)
Syngrapha ain (Hochenwarth, 1785)
Syngrapha diasema (Boisduval, 1829)
Syngrapha gilarovi Kljutschko, 1983
Syngrapha hochenwarthi (Hochenwarth, 1785)
Syngrapha interrogationis (Linnaeus, 1758)
Syngrapha microgamma (Hübner, [1823])
Syngrapha ottolengui (Dyar, 1903)
Syngrapha parilis (Hübner, [1809])
Sypnoides fumosa (Butler, 1877)
Sypnoides hercules (Butler, 1881)
Sypnoides picta (Butler, 1877)
Tambana plumbea (Butler, 1881)
Tarachidia candefacta (Hübner, [1827])
Teinoptera olivina (Herrich-Schäffer, 1852)
Telorta divergens (Butler, 1879)
Telorta edentata (Leech, 1889)
Teratoglaea pacifica Sugi, 1958
Thalpophila matura (Hufnagel, 1766)
Tholera cespitis ([Denis & Schiffermüller], 1775)
Tholera decimalis (Poda, 1761)
Tholera hilaris (Staudinger, 1901)
Thyas juno (Dalman, 1823)
Thysanoplusia intermixta (Warren, 1913)
Tiliacea auragides (Draudt, 1950)
Tiliacea citrago (Linnaeus, 1758)
Tiliacea japonago (Wileman & West, 1929)
Trachea atriplicis (Linnaeus, 1758)
Trachea melanospila Kollar, [1844]
Trachea punkikonis Matsumura, 1927
Trachea tokiensis (Butler, 1884)
Trichoplusia ni (Hübner, [1803])
Trichosea champa (Moore, 1879)
Trichosea ludifica (Linnaeus, 1758)
Triphaenopsis cinerescens Butler, 1885
Triphaenopsis insolita Remm, 1983
Triphaenopsis jezoensis Sugi, 1962
Triphaenopsis lucilla Butler, 1878
Triphaenopsis postflava (Leech, 1900)
Trisateles emortualis ([Denis & Schiffermüller], 1775)
Tyta luctuosa ([Denis & Schiffermüller], 1775)
Ulochlaena hirta (Hübner, 1813)
Usbeca kulmburgi (Rebel, 1918)
Valeria dilutiapicata Filipjev, 1927
Victrix fabiani Varga & L. Ronkay, 1989
Victrix frigidalis Varga & L. Ronkay, 1991
Victrix umovii (Eversmann, 1846)
Virgo datanidia (Butler, 1885)
Xanthia togata (Esper, 1788)
Xanthocosmia jankowskii (Oberthür, 1884)
Xanthograpta basinigra Sugi, 1982
Xanthomantis contaminata (Draudt, 1937)
Xanthomantis cornelia (Staudinger, 1888)
Xenotrachea niphonica Kishida & Yoshimoto, 1979
Xestia aequaeva (Benjamin, 1934)
Xestia agathina (Duponchel, 1827)
Xestia alaskae (Grote, 1876)
Xestia albonigra (Kononenko, 1981)
Xestia albuncula (Eversmann, 1851)
Xestia alpicola (Zetterstedt, 1839)
Xestia ashworthii (Doubleday, 1855)
Xestia atrata (Morrison, 1874)
Xestia baja ([Denis & Schiffermüller], 1775)
Xestia banghaasi (Corti & Draudt, 1933)
Xestia borealis (Nordstrom, 1933)
Xestia brunneopicta (Matsumura, 1925)
Xestia castanea (Esper, 1798)
Xestia cohaesa (Herrich-Schäffer, 1849)
Xestia collina (Boisduval, 1840)
Xestia descripta (Bremer, 1861)
Xestia dilatata (Butler, 1879)
Xestia distensa (Eversmann, 1851)
Xestia ditrapezium ([Denis & Schiffermüller], 1775)
Xestia efflorescens (Butler, 1879)
Xestia fergusoni Lafontaine, 1983
Xestia fuscogrisea Кononenko, 1981
Xestia fuscostigma (Bremer, 1861)
Xestia gelida (Sparre-Schneider, 1883)
Xestia homogena (McDunnough, 1921)
Xestia intermedia Kononenko, 1981
Xestia inuitica Lafontaine &, Hensel, 1998
Xestia kollari (Lederer, 1853)
Xestia kolymae (Herz, 1903)
Xestia kruegeri Kononenko & Schmitz, 2004
Xestia kurentzovi (Kononenko, 1984)
Xestia laetabilis (Zetterstedt, 1839)
Xestia liquidaria (Eversmann, 1844)
Xestia lorezi (Staudinger, 1891)
Xestia lyngei (Rebel, 1923)
Xestia magadanensis Kononenko & Lafontaine, 1983
Xestia magadanica (Kononenko, 1981)
Xestia ochreago (Hübner,[1809])
Xestia ochrops Kononenko, 1996
Xestia okakensis (Packard, 1867)
Xestia penthima (Erschoff, 1870)
Xestia quieta (Hübner, [1813])
Xestia rhaetica (Staudinger, 1871)
Xestia rodionovi Mikkola, 1996
Xestia sareptana (Herrich-Schäffer, 1851)
Xestia semiherbida (Walker, 1857)
Xestia sexstrigata (Haworth, 1809)
Xestia similis (Kononenko, 1981)
Xestia sincera (Herrich-Schäffer, 1851)
Xestia speciosa (Hübner, [1813])
Xestia stigmatica (Hübner, [1813])
Xestia stupenda (Butler, 1878)
Xestia subgrisea (Staudinger, 1897)
Xestia tecta (Hübner, [1808])
Xestia thula Lafontaine & Kononenko, 1983
Xestia triangulum (Hufnagel, 1766)
Xestia trifida (Fischer von Waldheim, 1820)
Xestia undosa (Leech, 1889)
Xestia ursae (McDunnough, 1940)
Xestia vidua (Staudinger, 1892)
Xestia wockei (Moschler, 1862)
Xestia xanthographa ([Denis & Schiffermüller], 1775)
Xestia c-nigrum (Linnaeus, 1758)
Xylena confusa Kononenko & L. Ronkay, 1998
Xylena exsoleta (Linnaeus, 1758)
Xylena lunifera (Warren, 1910)
Xylena vetusta (Hübner, [1813])
Xylomoia fusei Sugi, 1976
Xylomoia graminea (Graeser, 1889)
Xylomoia retinax Mikkola, 1998
Xylomoia strix Mikkola, 1980
Xylopolia bellula Kononenko & L. Ronkay, 1995
Zanclognatha fumosa (Butler, 1879)
Zanclognatha griselda (Butler, 1879)
Zanclognatha helva (But1er, 1879)
Zanclognatha lilacina (Butler, 1879)
Zanclognatha lunalis (Scopoli, 1763)
Zanclognatha obliqua (Staudinger, 1892)
Zanclognatha perfractalis Bryk, 1948
Zanclognatha reticulatis (Leech, 1900)
Zanclognatha subgriselda Sugi, 1959
Zanclognatha tarsipennalis (Treitschke, 1835)
Zanclognatha tenuialis Rebel, 1896
Zanclognatha triplex (Leech, 1900)
Zanclognatha tristriga W. Kozhantschikov, 1929
Zanclognatha umbrosalis Staudinger, 1892
Zanclognatha violacealis Staudinger, 1892
Zekelita antiqualis (Hübner, [1813])
Zekelita ravalis (Herrich-Schäffer, 1851)
Zekelita ravulalis (Staudinger, 1879)

Micronoctuidae
Mimachrostia fasciata Sugi, 1982
Parens occi (Fibiger & Kononenko, 2008)

Arctiidae
Acerbia alpina (Quensel, 1802)
Aemene taeniata (Fixsen, 1887)
Amurrhyparia leopardinula (Strand, 1919)
Arctia flavia (Fuessly, 1779)
Arctia olschwangi Dubatolov, 1990
Arctia caja (Linnaeus, 1758)
Atolmis rubricollis (Linnaeus, 1758)
Axiopoena karelini (Menetries, 1863)
Bizone adelina Staudinger, 1887
Borearctia menetriesii (Eversmann, 1846)
Callimorpha dominula (Linnaeus, 1758)
Centrarctia mongolica (Аlpheraky, 1888)
Chelis caecilia (Kindermann, 1853)
Chelis dahurica (Boisduval, 1834)
Chelis maculosa (Gerning, 1780)
Chelis obliterata (Stretch, 1885)
Chelis philipiana Ferguson, 1985
Chelis quenseli (Paykull, 1793)
Chelis reticulata (Christoph, 1887)
Chionarctia nivea (Menetries, 1858)
Collita coreana (Leech, 1888)
Collita digna (Ignatyev & Witt, 2007)
Collita griseola (Hübner, 1803)
Collita okanoi (Inoue, 1961)
Collita vetusta (Walker, 1854)
Coscinia cribraria (Linnaeus, 1758)
Cybosia mesomella (Linnaeus, 1758)
Cymbalophora rivularis (Menetries, 1832)
Diacrisia irene Butler, 1881
Diacrisia sannio (Linnaeus, 1758)
Diaphora mendica (Clerck, 1759)
Dodia albertae Dyar, 1901
Dodia diaphana (Eversmann, 1848)
Dodia kononenkoi Tshistjakov & Lafontaine, 1984
Dodia maja Rekelj & Česanek, 2009
Dodia sazonovi Dubatolov, 1990
Dodia sikhotensis Tshistjakov, 1988
Dodia transbaikalensis Tshistjakov, 1988
Eilema aegrotum (Butler, 1877)
Eilema affineolum (Bremer, 1864)
Eilema anticum (Walker, 1854)
Eilema atratulum (Eversmann, 1847)
Eilema caniolum (Hilbner, [1808])
Eilema complanum (Linnaeus, 1758)
Eilema coreanum (Leech, [1889])
Eilema cribratum (Staudinger, 1887)
Eilema debile (Staudinger, 1887)
Eilema deplanum (Esper, 1787)
Eilema flavociliatum (Lederer, 1853)
Eilema griseolum (Hübner, [1803])
Eilema hyalinofuscatum Tshistjakov, 1990
Eilema japonicum (Leech, [1889])
Eilema lurideolum ([Zincken], 1817)
Eilema lutarellum (Linnaeus, 1758)
Eilema minor Okano, 1955
Eilema nankingicum (Daniel, 1954)
Eilema nigripodum (Bremer & Grey, 1852)
Eilema nigrocollare Tshistjakov, 1990
Eilema palliatellum (Scopoli, 1763)
Eilema pseudocomplanum (Daniel, 1939)
Eilema pygmaeolum (Doubleday, 1847)
Eilema sororculum (Hufnagel, 1766)
Eilema ussuricum (Daniel, 1954)
Eilema vakulenkoi Tshistjakov, 1990
Epatolmis caesarea (Goeze, 1781)
Epimydia dialampra Staudinger, 1892
Eucharia festiva (Hufnagel, 1766)
Euplagia quadripunctaria (Poda, 1761)
Ghoria collitoides (Butler, 1885)
Ghoria gigantea (Oberthür, 1879)
Grammia kodara Dubatolov & Schmidt, 2005
Heliosia rufa (Leech, 1890)
Holoarctia dubatolovi Saldaitis & Ivinskis, 2005
Holoarctia marinae Dubatolov, 1985
Holoarctia puengeleri (О. Bang-Haas, 1927)
Hyperborea czekanowskii Grum-Grshimailo, [1900]
Hyphantria cunea (Drury, 1773)
Hyphoraia aulica (Linnaeus, 1758)
Lacydes spectabilis (Tauscher, 1806)
Lithosia quadra (Linnaeus, 1758)
Macrobrochis staudingeri (Alphéraky, 1897)
Manulea pseudofumidisca Dubatolov & Zolotuhin, 2011
Melanaema venata Butler, 1877
Miltochrista aberrans Butler, 1877
Miltochrista calamina Butler, 1877
Miltochrista miniata (Forster, 1771)
Miltochrista pallida (Bremer, 1864)
Miltochrista pulchra Butler, 1877
Miltochrista rosacea (Bremer, 1861)
Miltochrista striata (Bremer & Grey, 1852)
Nudaria mundana (Linnaeus, 1761)
Nudaridia muscula (Staudinger, 1887)
Nudaridia ochracea (Bremer, 1861)
Nudina artaxidia (Butler, 1881)
Ocnogyna loewii (Zeller, 1846)
Paidia murina (Hübner, 1790)
Palearctia mira Dubatolov & Tshistjakov, 1989
Pararctia lapponica (Thunberg, 1791)
Pararctia subnebulosa (Dyar, 1899)
Parasemia plantaginis (Linnaeus, 1758)
Parasiccia altaica (Lederer, 1855)
Pelosia angusta (Staudinger, 1887)
Pelosia muscerda (Hufnagel, 1766)
Pelosia noctis (Butler, 1881)
Pelosia obtusa (Herrich-Schäffer, 1847)
Pelosia ramosula (Staudinger, 1887)
Pericallia matronula (Linnaeus, 1758)
Phragmatobia amurensis Seitz, 1910
Phragmatobia fuliginosa (Linnaeus, 1758)
Platarctia atropurpurea (О. Bang-Haas, 1927)
Rhyparia purpurata (Linnaeus, 1758)
Rhyparioides amurensis (Bremer, 1861)
Rhyparioides metelkana (Lederer, 1861)
Rhyparioides nebulosa Butler, 1877
Setema cereola (Hübner, [1803])
Setina aurata (Menetries, 1832)
Setina irrorella (Linnaeus, 1758)
Setina roscida ([Denis & Schiffermüller], 1775)
Sibirarctia buraetica (О. Bang-Haas, 1927)
Sibirarctia kindermanni (Staudinger, 1867)
Somatrichia parasita (Hübner, 1790)
Spilarctia lutea (Hufnagel, 1766)
Spilarctia obliquizonata (Miyake, 1910)
Spilarctia seriatopunctata (Motschulsky, [1861])
Spilarctia subcarnea (Walker, 1855)
Spilosoma lubricipedum (Linnaeus, 1758)
Spilosoma mienshanicum Daniel, 1943
Spilosoma punctarium (Stoll, [1782])
Spilosoma urticae (Esper, 1789)
Spiris bipunctata (Staudinger, 1892)
Spiris striata (Linnaeus, 1758)
Stigmatophora flava (Bremer & Grey, 1852)
Stigmatophora leacrita (Swinhoe, 1894)
Stigmatophora micans (Bremer & Grey, 1852)
Stigmatophora rhodophila (Walker, 1864)
Thumatha senex (Hübner, [1808])
Thyrgorina boghaika (Tshistjakov & Kishida, 1994)
Thyrgorina jankowskii (Oberthür, [1881])
Tyria jacobaeae (Linnaeus, 1758)
Utetheisa lotrix (Cramer, 1779)
Utetheisa pulchella (Linnaeus, 1758)
Watsonarctia deserta (Bartel, 1902)
Epicallia villica (Linnaeus, 1758)

Syntomidae
Dysauxes ancilla (Linnaeus, 1758)
Dysauxes famula (Freyer, 1836)
Dysauxes punctata (Fabricius, 1781)
Syntomis caspia Staudinger, 1877
Syntomis fortunei (de l'Orza, 1859)
Syntomis ganssuensis Grum-Grshimailo, 1890
Syntomis germana С.Felder & R.Felder, 1862
Syntomis kruegeri (Ragusa, 1904)
Syntomis nigricornis Alphéraky, 1883
Syntomis phegea (Linnaeus, 1758)
Syntomis transcaspica (Obraztsov, 1941)

References 

Moths